Simon Johansson (born 14 June 1999) is a Swedish professional ice hockey defenceman currently playing for the Iowa Wild of the American Hockey League (AHL) as a prospect to the Minnesota Wild in the National Hockey League (NHL). He was selected in the fifth round, 148th overall, by the Wild in the 2018 NHL Entry Draft.

Playing career
Johansson made his SHL debut playing for Djurgårdens IF during the 2017–18 season, playing eight games and scoring one goal. Following four professional seasons within Djurgårdens IF, Johansson left Swedish and signed with Finnish Liiga side Ilves for the 2021–22 Liiga season.

Johansson enjoyed a break out season with Ilves, recording 32 points in 58 games from the blueline resulting in becoming the youngest defensemen in Ilves history to score 32 points in a season. 

On 28 April 2022, Johansson was signed by his NHL draft club, the Minnesota Wild, agreeing to a two-year, entry-level contract to begin in the  season.

Personal life
Johansson in the son of manager and retired ice hockey player Thomas Johansson and brother of professional ice hockey player Anton Johansson.

Career statistics

References

External links

1999 births
Living people
Almtuna IS players
Djurgårdens IF Hockey players
Iowa Wild players
Minnesota Wild draft picks
Mora IK players
Ice hockey people from Stockholm
Ilves players
Swedish ice hockey defencemen